Fernand Jourdant (3 February 1903 – 2 January 1956) was a French fencer. He won a gold medal in the team épée event at the 1932 Summer Olympics.

References

External links
 

1903 births
1956 deaths
French male épée fencers
Olympic fencers of France
Fencers at the 1932 Summer Olympics
Olympic gold medalists for France
Olympic medalists in fencing
Sportspeople from Orne
Medalists at the 1932 Summer Olympics
20th-century French people